Nemonymous was a short fiction publication that labeled itself a "megazanthus" (a portmanteau of magazine and anthology). It was published in the United Kingdom from 2001–2010, and edited by British writer D. F. Lewis.

This publication was distinctive in that all stories were published anonymously, with the identities of contributing authors being normally withheld until the following issue, an arrangement intended to temporarily strip the reader of any prejudices surrounding the author's name (including popularity, gender and place of origin), and thus level the playing field for the writer. (Later issues did not follow this exact model.)

History
The first issue of Nemonymous, subtitled A Journal of Parthenogenetic Fiction and Late Labelling, appeared in November 2001. Nine issues were published through July 2010. The final four editions were more like books than journals: Zencore (2007), Cone Zero (2008), Cern Zoo (2009) and Null Immortalis (2010).

All stories saw their first publication in Nemonymous. A few notable republications after appearing in Nemonymous: "The Assistant To Dr Jacob" by Eric Schaller and "England and Nowhere" by Tim Nickels were chosen for Year's Best Fantasy and Horror anthologies. "Scenes From an Unfinished Film" by Gary McMahon was chosen for Year's Best Dark Fantasy & Horror. "The Lion's Den" by Steve Duffy was chosen for The Weird edited by Ann and Jeff VanderMeer.

Two stories apparently remain anonymous in perpetuo: the influential "Vanishing Life and Films of Emmanuel Escobada" and "George the Baker." Also, Nemonymous Two in 2002 is reputed to have published the world's first blank story. And Nemonymous Six existed only through its non-existence, according to records.

Nemonymous published brand new fiction by many authors including stories by:
Allen Ashley, Daniel Ausema, Stephen Bacon, Tony Ballantyne, Rosalind Barden, Keith Brooke, David J. Brown, Tim Casson, Mike Chinn, Simon Clark, Dominy Clements, Brendan Connell, Lesley Corina, Gary Couzens, Jetse de Vries, Steve Duffy, Lawrence Dyer, Scott Edelman, Paul Evanby, David M. Fitzpatrick, Gary Fry, Avital Gad-Cykman, Terry Gates-Grimwood, Richard Gavin, John Grant, Roy Gray, David V. Griffin, Colin Hains, A. D. Harvey, Jeff Holland, Andrew Hook, Brian Howell, Rhys Hughes, Derek John, Paul Kane, Michael Kelly, Rachel Kendall, A. J. Kirby, Jay Lake, Joel Lane, Bob Lock, Tony Lovell, Gary McMahon, William Meikle, Paul Meloy, Tony Mileman, Regina Mitchell, Robert Morrish, Joe Murphy, Robert Neilson, Tim Nickels, Mike O'Driscoll, Reggie Oliver, Monica O'Rourke, Daniel Pearlman, Ursula Pflug, Cameron Pierce, Steven Pirie, Joseph S. Pulver, Jamie Rosen,  Iain Rowan, Eric Schaller, Ekaterina Sedia, Jacqueline Seewald, Marge Simon, Sarah Singleton, Steve Rasnic Tem, G. W. Thomas, Lavie Tidhar, John Travis, S. D. Tullis, Mark Valentine, Jeff VanderMeer, D. P. Watt, Neil Williamson, D. Harlan Wilson, A. C. Wise, Tamar Yellin and others.

See also
 Science fiction magazine
 Fantasy fiction magazine
 Horror fiction magazine

External links
 Nemonymous from Megazanthus Press
 Review of Nemonymous 10 by Matthew Fryer
 Review of Nemonymous 5 from Whispers of Wickedness (archived)
 Review of Nemonymous 8 at TFF-Reviews
 Interview with editor and authors at TTA Press

2001 establishments in the United Kingdom
2010 disestablishments in the United Kingdom
Defunct science fiction magazines published in the United Kingdom
Magazines established in 2001
Magazines disestablished in 2010